Louie is an American television comedy created, written, directed by, and starring stand-up comedian Louis C.K. The series has aired for five seasons on the cable channel FX since June 29, 2010.  The show centers on a fictionalized version of C.K.'s life as a comedian, father, and divorcé.

Since its debut, the series has earned widespread critical acclaim and has been nominated for a variety of different awards, including twenty-two Primetime Emmy Awards (three wins for the series), eight Television Critics Association Awards (three wins), two Golden Globe Awards, four Writers Guild of America Awards (three wins), three Directors Guild of America Award, two Screen Actors Guild Awards, and two Producers Guild of America Awards.

C.K. has been nominated for nineteen individual awards for his role as the series lead, seven as director, nine as writer, and thirteen as producer.  Several of C.K.'s collaborators have also been nominated for various awards including series producers M. Blair Breard, Tony Hernandez, Dave Becky, Vernon Chatman, and Steven Wright, frequent co-writer and recurring guest star Pamela Adlon, and guest actors Melissa Leo, David Lynch, and Sarah Baker.  As of 2016, Louie has won 16 awards from a total of 62 nominations.

Emmy Awards
Awarded since 1949, the Primetime Emmy Award is an annual accolade bestowed by members of the Academy of Television Arts & Sciences recognizing outstanding achievements in American prime time television programming.  Awards presented for more technical and production-based categories (like art direction, casting, and editing) are designated "Creative Arts Emmy Awards."  As of 2016, Louie has won three awards from a total of twenty-two nominations.

Primetime Emmy Awards

Primetime Creative Arts Emmy Awards

Critics' Choice Television Awards
The Critics' Choice Television Award is an annual accolade bestowed by the Broadcast Television Journalists Association in recognition of outstanding achievements in television, since 2011. As of 2016, Louie has won two awards from a total of ten nominations.

Directors Guild of America Awards
The Directors Guild of America Award is an annual accolade bestowed by the Directors Guild of America in recognition of outstanding achievements in film and television directing, since 1938.  As of 2016, Louie has been nominated for three awards.

Golden Globe Awards
The Golden Globe Award is an annual accolade bestowed by members of the Hollywood Foreign Press Association recognizing outstanding achievements in film and television, since 1944.  As of 2016, Louie has been nominated for two awards.

Producers Guild of America Awards
The Producers Guild of America Award is an annual accolade bestowed by the Producers Guild of America in recognition of outstanding achievements in film and television producing, since 1990.  As of 2016, Louie has been nominated for two awards.

Satellite Awards
The Satellite Award is an annual accolade bestowed by members of the International Press Academy recognizing outstanding achievements in film and television.  As of 2016, Louie has won one award from a total of four nominations.

Screen Actors Guild Awards
Awarded since 1995, the Screen Actors Guild Award is an annual accolade bestowed by members of SAG-AFTRA recognizing outstanding achievements in acting in television.  As of 2016, Louie has been nominated for three awards.

Television Critics Association Awards
The TCA Award is an annual accolade bestowed by the Television Critics Association in recognition of outstanding achievements in television.  As of 2016, Louie has won four awards from a total of eight nominations.

Writers Guild of America Awards
The Writers Guild of America Award is an annual accolade bestowed by the Writers Guild of America in recognition of outstanding achievements in film, television, and radio, since 1949.  As of 2016, Louie has won three awards from a total of four nominations.

Other awards

References

External links
 List of Primetime Emmy Awards and nominations received by Louie
 List of awards and nominations received by Louie at the Internet Movie Database

Louie